The 2006 Commonwealth of Independent States Cup was the fourteenth edition of the competition between the champions of former republics of Soviet Union. It was won by Neftchi Baku for the first time.

Participants

 1 CSKA Moscow were represented by reserve players.
 2 Shakhtar Donetsk were represented by Shakhtar-2 players.
 3 FBK Kaunas replaced Ekranas Panevėžys (2005 Lithuanian champions) who refused to participate.

Group stage

Group A

Results

Group B

Results

Group C

 3-way tie-breaker between tied teams:

Results

Group D
Unofficial table

Official table

Results

Final rounds

Quarterfinals

Semifinals

1 Neftchi were awarded a win after Pyunik refused to play against Azerbaijani club for safety concerns (related to ongoing Nagorno-Karabakh conflict).

Finals

Top scorers

References

External links
2006 CIS Cup at rsssf.com
2006 CIS Cup at football.by
2006 CIS Cup at kick-off.by

2006
2006 in Russian football
2005–06 in Ukrainian football
2005–06 in European football
January 2006 sports events in Russia
2006 in Moscow